Barris and Company was a Canadian variety and talk television series which aired on CBC Television from 1968 to 1969.

Premise
Host Alex Barris conducted this live variety broadcast following CBC's hockey games. Alex Trebek was Barris' partner, replaced later on the series run by Janet Baird.

Production
The initial producer, Stan Jacobson, left the series for work in Hollywood during the series run and was replaced by Bob Jarvis. Initial writers Lorne Michaels and Hart Pomerantz also left mid-series for California. Guido Basso led the show's band.

Scheduling
The half-hour series aired Saturdays at approximately 10:30 p.m. following Hockey Night in Canada from 21 September 1968 to 25 January 1969. The cancellation followed poor critical reviews, substantial turnover of writing and production staff and other complications such as pre-emptions due to the 1968 Summer Olympics broadcasts.

References

External links
 
 

CBC Television original programming
1968 Canadian television series debuts
1969 Canadian television series endings